2019 in the Philippines details events of note that have occurred in the Philippines in 2019.

Incumbents

 
 President: Rodrigo Duterte (PDP–Laban)
 Vice President: Leni Robredo (Liberal)
 Congress (17th, ended June 4):
 Senate President: Tito Sotto (NPC)
 House Speaker: Gloria Macapagal Arroyo (PDP–Laban) (until June 30)
 Congress (18th, convened July 22):
 Senate President: Vicente Sotto III (NPC)
 House Speaker: Alan Peter Cayetano (Nacionalista) (elected July 22)
 Chief Justice:  
 Lucas Bersamin (until October 18)
 Antonio Carpio (acting) (October 18–23)
 Diosdado Peralta (from October 23)

Events

January 

 January 8 – Hanjin Heavy Industries and Construction Philippines (HHIC Phil) filed for corporate rehabilitation after it declared bankruptcy; the biggest ever bankruptcy in the Philippines surpassing the more than $386 million financial losses in the country related to the Lehman Brothers bankruptcy of 2008. HHIC defaulted its $412 million loan credited to five local banking firms.
 January 10:
President Rodrigo Duterte signs Republic Act. No. 11188, providing special protection of children in armed conflict.
 Maia Santos Deguito, the former bank manager of Rizal Commercial Banking Corporation (RCBC) was found guilty of money laundering in connection with the $81-million cyber heist on Bangladesh's central bank in 2016.
 January 21 – A plebiscite takes place with the majority of voters deciding to ratify the Bangsamoro Organic Law creating the Bangsamoro Autonomous Region and abolishing the Autonomous Region in Muslim Mindanao. Cotabato City also votes to join the new autonomous region while in Isabela City in Basilan rejects its inclusion to the region.
 January 24 – The International Union for Conservation of Nature (IUCN) has placed tawilis on the list of endangered species.
 January 27:
 At least 20 people were killed while 111 people were injured as explosions rocked the Cathedral of Our Lady of Mount Carmel in Jolo, Sulu.
January 28 – Lawmakers propose to lower the age of criminal responsibility, sparking outrage.

February 
 February 6 – The second round of the Bangamoro Organic Law plebiscite is held with voters in 67 barangays in North Cotabato and 6 towns in Lanao del Norte deciding if they are in favor of their localities joining the proposed Bangsamoro Autonomous Region. 63 barangays in North Cotabato votes to join the new autonomous region while 6 municipalities in Lanao del Norte rejects its inclusion to the region.
 February 13 – Rappler CEO Maria Ressa is arrested by the National Bureau of Investigation (NBI) for cyber libel upon orders from Manila Regional Trial Court Branch 46. She posted bail the next day. Ressa claimed that her right to due process was violated, since she was not informed of the complaint against her. She also described her arrest as an "abuse of power" and  "weaponization of the law". Ressa's arrest was condemned by journalists, organizations, and influential figures from the Philippines and abroad, describing it as an attack on press freedom. Presidential Spokesperson Salvador Panelo denied that the government was trying to silence press freedom. President Rodrigo Duterte has repeatedly labeled Rappler as "fake news" as he perceived the online news site to be too critical of his administration. However, the libel complaint was filed by businessman Wilfredo Keng regarding a Rappler article published in May 2012 (updated in February 2014) where Keng was alleged to have lent a vehicle to Chief Justice Renato Corona, who was undergoing an impeachment trial at the time. The article also linked Keng to human trafficking and drug smuggling.
 February 14 – President Rodrigo Duterte signs Republic Act No. 11201, creating the Department of Human Settlements and Urban Development.
 February 22 – President Rodrigo Duterte signs the Tulong-Trabaho Act (Republic Act 11230), mandating free access to technical-vocational education.
 February 26 – The Bangsamoro Autonomous Region was formally established and the Bangsamoro Transition Authority (BTA) is constituted.

March 
 Since March 6 – Numerous areas across Metro Manila, estimated to be 52,000 households by Manila Water, experience water scarcity. Manila Water COO Geodino Carpio cited the delay of water infrastructure projects, such as the constructions of a wastewater treatment plant in Cardona, Rizal and the Kaliwa Dam in Tanay, Rizal, for the issue. Manila Water also noted the critically low levels of the La Mesa Dam, its lowest level in 12 years, which the company relies on as their emergency supply of water source.
 March 15 – Former Ombudsman Conchita Carpio-Morales and former Secretary of Foreign Affairs Albert del Rosario filed a case in the International Criminal Court (ICC) against Chinese President Xi Jinping and other Chinese government officials for alleged crimes against humanity. The complaint cited environmental damage in the South China Sea due to land reclamation, occupation of islands, and destructive fishing activities conducted by China. The communication was delivered to the ICC two days before the Philippines' ICC withdrawal became effective.
 March 17 – The Philippines formally withdraws from the International Criminal Court after the country's withdrawal notification was received by the Secretary-General of the United Nations last year. The court earlier launched a preliminary investigation whether it has jurisdiction to tackle on allegations of state-sanctioned human rights violations in the Philippine Drug War.
 March 21 – President Rodrigo Duterte officially declares the permanent termination of peace negotiations with the CPP-NPA-NDF.
 March 29 – Rappler CEO and journalist Maria Ressa is arrested for allegedly violating the Anti-Dummy Law, which prohibits foreigners from intervening in the management and operation of a Filipino media company. She was released the same day after posting bail. The charge is based on Rappler's issuance of Philippine Depositary receipts (PDRs) to the American company Omidyar Network in 2015. Ressa described her arrest as an attack on press freedom, accusing the Philippine government of being "intolerant of journalists". Presidential Spokesperson Salvador Panelo responded, saying: "press freedom has nothing to do with the charges... She's charged of a crime and there is a determination of probable cause hence a warrant of arrest has been issued... She cannot be always using the freedom of the press as an excuse to attack the administration."
 March 30 – Fourteen people are killed during the police operations across Negros Oriental. Human rights and farmer groups condemned the incident, whom they said that these people were killed were merely the farmers and tricycle drivers.

April 
 April 3 – A series of video was uploaded by the account named "Ang Totoong Narcolist" on YouTube, accusing the Duterte family, as well as former Special Assistant to the President (SAP) Bong Go, of involving in the illegal drug trade. Rodel Jayme is arrested on April 30 by the NBI for sharing "Bikoy" videos accusing President Rodrigo Duterte and his family of their involvement in the illegal drug trade.
 April 5 – Republic Act 11259 is signed into law, approving the proposed division of the province of Palawan into three provinces: Palawan del Norte, Palawan Oriental and Palawan del Sur. Once approved in a future plebiscite, the province of Palawan will be dissolved. 
 April 10 – Fossil fragments found in the Callao Cave in the Philippines reveal the existence of the "Homo luzonensis" species of humans. The species is named after the island where it was discovered, Luzon.
 April 12 – President Rodrigo Duterte signs the Magna Carta of the Poor (Republic Act 11291), which aims to uplift the standard of living of poor Filipinos.
 April 17:
 President Rodrigo Duterte signs into law the Safe Spaces Act (Republic Act 11313), punishing gender-based sexual harassment such as wolf-whistling and catcalling in public spaces.
 President Rodrigo Duterte signs the Pantawid Pamilyang Pilipino Program (4Ps) Act, institutionalizing the 4Ps cash transfer program and seeking to reduce poverty by providing "conditional cash transfer to poor households for a maximum period of seven years.
 April 22:
 A 6.1-magnitude earthquake hit large parts of Luzon, leaving at least 16 person killed and injured 81 others.
 The "Oust-Duterte" matrix, containing the destabilization efforts by media organizations and journalists against Duterte, was revealed to the public.
 April 23 – A 6.5-magnitude earthquake hit the island of Visayas with the epicenter at San Julian, Eastern Samar less than 24 hours after the Luzon earthquake.

May 

 May 6 – Peter Joemel Advincula, the man claimed to be "Bikoy", a hooded-figure in the video, reveals himself to the public where he asked for legal assistance. Advincula also denied the links of any political position. On May 23, Advincula surrenders to the Camp Crame, where he retracted the statement by claiming to the public that the videos were "orchestrated" by LP and Senator Trillanes. He also said that he is vowed to received  in exchange of being there in the video.
 May 13 – Philippine general elections were held. Voters elects new members of the House of Representatives as well as elect 12 members of the Senate to join the 12 winners of the 2016 Senate elections.
 May 21 – Former Ombudsman Conchita Carpio-Morales has been denied entry to Hong Kong due to her "security threat". Though the Hong Kong did not explain the cause, the Malacañang stated that it was a retaliation of Chinese government against Carpio-Morales for filing an ICC criminal case against Chinese President Xi Jinping and other officials over the China's land reclamation in the disputed South China Sea.
 May 22 – Commission on Elections (COMELEC), sitting as the National Board of Canvassers (NBOC), proclaims 12 winning senators in the midterm elections. It also proclaims 51 winning party-list members as well.

June 

 June 8 – Religious corporation Kapa-Community Ministry International was shut down by the authorities under the orders of President Rodrigo Duterte over the allegations of Ponzi scheme.
 June 9 – A fishing boat F/B Gem-Ver sank at Reed Bank after the Chinese vessel rammed the boat.
 June 10 – Dr. Brian Sy, owner of the WellMed Dialysis Center in Quezon City who were accused of making "ghost" claims with the Philippine Health Insurance Corp (PhilHealth) is arrested by the National Bureau of Investigation (NBI) for the charges of estafa, falsification of public documents, and violation of the PhilHealth law.
 June 17 – The Manila Metropolitan Trial Court Branch 14 has found John Paul Solano, a member of the Aegis Juris Fraternity, guilty of obstruction of justice in connection with the Atio Castillo hazing case.
 June 21 – Former Foreign Affairs Secretary Albert del Rosario has been denied entry to Hong Kong due to known reasons even if he carried a valid diplomatic passport.
 June 27 – Several opposition groups began to file the impeachment complaints against Rodrigo Duterte due to Reed Bank incident and his subsequent policy of "allowing China to fish in the Exclusive Economic Zone (EEZ) in the West Philippine Sea".
 June 29 – Tons of Canadian garbage left in the Philippines in 2013 and 2014, has finally docked in a port on the outskirts of Vancouver and putting an end to a festering diplomatic row that highlighted how Asian nations have grown tired of being the world's trash dump.

July 
 July 8 – President Rodrigo Duterte has awarded a certificate of public convenience and necessity (CPCN) to Dito Telecommunity, the consortium of Davao City-based businessman Dennis Uy and allowing it to operate.
 July 11 – A resolution initiated by Iceland was adopted by the United Nations Human Rights Council calling for an investigation on the human rights situation in the Philippines including deaths linked to President Rodrigo Duterte's campaign against drugs in the country.
 July 13 – Father Gerard Francisco Timoner III from Daet, Camarines Norte is elected the Master of the Order of Preachers, the head of the Dominican Order, for a nine-year term. Timoner is the first Filipino, as well as the first Asian, to be elected as such.
 Since July 18 – A series of killings occurred in Negros Oriental when four police officers were killed by the suspected communists groups.
 July 18 – The Philippine National Police (PNP) has filed a sedition complaint against Vice President Leni Robredo, several senators and opposition personalities in connection with videos annotated by a certain Bikoy, who linked members of the Duterte family to illegal drugs.
 July 26 – President Rodrigo Duterte has ordered a halt in all gaming operations with franchises, licenses or permits granted by the Philippine Charity Sweepstakes Office (PCSO), citing corruption. On July 27, the Philippine National Police (PNP) has begun shutting down lotto kiosks and other gaming outlets nationwide, after President Rodrigo Duterte ordered the suspension of gaming schemes authorized by the Philippine Charity Sweepstakes Office (PCSO). On July 30, President Rodrigo Duterte lifts the suspension of operations of lotto game. On August 22, President Rodrigo Duterte lifts the suspension on the operations of Small Town Lottery (STL) in the country. On September 28, President Rodrigo Duterte lifts the suspension on the operations of Keno Game and Instant Sweepstakes Scratch-It schemes.
 July 27 – A magnitude 5.9 earthquake struck Batanes. It was preceded by a 5.4 magnitude foreshock. Nine people were killed by the combined effects of the earthquakes. A state of calamity was declared in the whole province.

August 

 August 2 – President Rodrigo Duterte signs Proclamation No. 781, that conferred the National Scientist title to American-educated plant geneticist and agronomist Emil Javier, who once served as president of the University of the Philippines.
 August 3 – At least 31 were killed when strong winds capsized three boats in Guimaras Strait.
 August 5:
 COMELEC cancels the nomination of former National Youth Commission Chairperson Ronald Cardema as representative of the Duterte Youth party-list due to misrepresentation. On September 13, Cardema formally withdraws his bid as the party-list's first nominee.
 Sandiganbayan dismisses a  billion civil case filed by the Presidential Commission on Good Government (PCGG) in 1987 against the family of former Pres. Ferdinand Marcos and their cronies, on the involvement of former Amb. Roberto Benedicto in the allegations of using dummies and government corporations to obtain assets.
 August 8 – President Rodrigo Duterte signs the Philippine Space Act (Republic Act No. 11363), creating the Philippine Space Agency (PhilSA).
 August 20 – News reports stated that former Calauan, Laguna Mayor Antonio Sanchez, the mastermind in the rape and murder of Eileen Sarmenta and Allan Gomez in 1993, "could have walked free in the next two months" after spending 25 years in prison, citing "good conduct" according to the document bearing the signature of Bureau of Corrections director Nicanor Faeldon. The impending release of Sanchez sparked nationwide outrage and condemnation. However, on August 22, Justice Secretary Menardo Guevarra and Bureau of Corrections (BuCor) Director-General Nicanor Faeldon has announced that former Calauan, Laguna Mayor Antonio Sanchez, the prime suspect in the Murders of Eileen Sarmenta and Allan Gomez in 1993, is not eligible under a 2013 law (RA No. 10592), that credits good conduct time allowance (GCTA) for an early release from prison. on August 26, President Rodrigo Duterte has ordered Justice Secretary Menardo Guevarra and Bureau of Corrections chief Nicanor Faeldon not to release convicted rapist-murderer Antonio Sanchez due to his bad behavior. On September 2, the Senate Blue Ribbon Committee begins its investigation on the supposed early release of rape and murder convict former mayor Antonio Sanchez and the controversial Good Conduct Time Allowance (GCTA) law. On same day, Bureau of Corrections Director General Nicanor Faeldon has confirmed that George Medialdea, Rogelio Corcolon and Zoilo Ama, the three men who were convicted for the June 1993 rape and killing of Eileen Sarmenta and Allan Gomez were already dead in jail.
 August 22 – Former foreign affairs chief Perfecto Yasay Jr. was arrested by Manila Police District (MPD) officers, in relation to criminal charges allegedly committed by officials of Banco Filipino.

September 

 September 1 – An 11-seater Beechcraft King Air 350 aircraft on a medevac mission from Dipolog Airport, Zamboanga del Norte to Ninoy Aquino International Airport, Manila crashed in Pansol, Calamba, killing all nine people on board and injuring two on the ground.
 September 2 – Bureau of Corrections Director General Nicanor Faeldon has confirmed the release of 4 persons convicted for the July 1997 murder of the Chiong sisters in Cebu. On September 6, Ariel Balansag and Alberto Caño, the two of the four convicts of the Chiong sisters rape-slay case, who were released by virtue of the controversial Good Conduct Time Allowance Law, has been surrendered to the authorities. On September 18, James Anthony Uy and Josman Aznar, the last two of the four convicts of the said case, has finally surrendered to the authorities.
 September 3 – The Supreme Court has dismissed the petition of attorney Jess Falcis for the removal of a legal barrier to same-sex marriages in the Philippines, even as it said the Constitution does not restrict marriage on the basis of sex.
 September 4 – President Rodrigo Duterte has fired Bureau of Corrections chief Nicanor Faeldon after the latter approved the release of several heinous crime convicts in the June 1993 rape and murder of Eileen Sarmenta and Allan Gomez and July 1997 rape and murder of Marijoy and Jacqueline Chiong. On September 5, Yolanda Camelon, wife of an inmate in NBP, testifies in the third Senate hearing on the Good Conduct Time Allowance (GCTA) law and claiming that Bureau of Corrections (BuCor) employees asked  from her in a botched deal to buy her husband's early release from prison. On September 9, Ombudsman Samuel Martires has ordered the suspension for six months without pay of 30 officials of the Bureau of Corrections in connection with the release of over 1,900 convicts of heinous crimes under the Good Conduct Time Allowance (GCTA) law.
 September 7 – Santo Tomas becomes a city in the province of Batangas through ratification of Republic Act 11086 which was approved on October 5, 2018.
 September 9 – The first case of African swine fever has been confirmed by the Department of Agriculture. It was also confirmed that an undisclosed number of individual pigs were culled in Rizal in a bid to contain a "suspected animal disease".
 September 18 – The Manila Metropolitan Trial Court Branch 15 has found, 8 Philippine Coast Guard personnel, guilty of homicide, for the killing of a Taiwanese fisherman off the northernmost province of Batanes in May 2013, which had sparked a diplomatic row between Taipei and Manila.
 September 20 – The Philippine Military Academy (PMA) has confirmed that Cadet 4th Class Darwin Dormitorio died of injuries resulting from hazing rites, supposedly at the hands of three upperclassmen inside the military school on September 18.
 September 24:
 Voted 17–0, the Senate has authorized the blue ribbon and justice committees to release the names of the rogue cops involved in the so-called "Agaw-bato" scheme, in which cops allegedly sell the illegal drugs they seized in narcotics operations.
 Lieutenant General Ronnie Evangelista and Brigadier General Bartolome Bacarro were resigned to their post in the Philippine Military Academy, following the death of 20-year-old PMA Cadet 4th Class Darwin Dormitorio due to hazing inside the academy. On October 9, Cadet 1st Class Ram Michael Navarro is also resigned to his post in PMA.
 September 25 – Sandiganbayan dismisses another civil case filed by the PCGG against the family of former Pres. Marcos and their cronies, on the involvement of former Amb. Bienvenido Tantoco and others on the family's hidden wealth; decision is released to the media on October 8.
 September 27 – The US Senate Appropriations Committee has approved an amendment to deny entry to any Philippine official who was involved in the two-year detention of Sen. Leila de Lima.

October
 October 1 – PNP chief Gen. Oscar Albayalde appears before the Senate's inquiry on "ninja cops", the police officers involved in the illegal drug trade. Albayalde denied the allegations of protecting his former subordinates who were accused of misappropriating a large quantity of illegal drugs seized in a drug raid in 2013. Albayalde was later resigned on October 14, because of the controversy. On October 21, the PNP–Criminal Investigation and Detection Group (CIDG) has added Albayalde as a respondent in criminal charges being reinvestigated by the Department of Justice (DOJ).
 October 2 – A fire at the Star City amusement park in Pasay, Metro Manila, Philippines, occurred at midnight on October 2, 2019.
 October 4 – BuCor chief Gerald Bantag orders the relief of some 300 guards at the maximum security compound of the New Bilibid Prison (NBP) in Muntinlupa.
 October 6 – Usage of the landline numbers with an additional digit from 7 digits is officially implemented, upon the order of the National Telecommunications Commission (NTC).
 October 8 – The Supreme Court (SC) has upheld the validity of a legal provision setting the minimum base pay for nurses in government health institutions to Salary Grade 15, but said implementing the clause would require a law providing funds for it.
 October 11 – The Supreme Court allows Filipina death row inmate Mary Jane Veloso to testify against her alleged recruiters through deposition in Indonesia.
 October 14 – Sandiganbayan dismisses another civil case filed by the PCGG against the family of former Pres. Marcos and their cronies, on the involvement of Fe and Ignacio Gimenez and others on the family's hidden wealth; decision is released to the media on October 25.
 October 15 – The Supreme Court (SC), sitting as the Presidential Electoral Tribunal (PET), has ordered the release of the official report on the initial vote recount involved in the election protest of former senator Bongbong Marcos against Vice President Leni Robredo.
 October 16 – The 2019 Cotabato series of earthquakes begins, with a 6.3 magnitude earthquake that killed at least 5 persons and injuring more than 53 others. Another earthquake on October 29 with a magnitude of 6.6 kills at least 9 people and injures 200 others. A third one on October 31, a magnitude 6.5, not considered to be an aftershock of the second event, kills at least 6 persons and injures more than 20 people. The epicenters of these earthquakes are located near Tulunan, Cotabato.
 October 18 – The Senate Blue Ribbon Committee, chaired by Senator Richard J. Gordon, announced and recommended the filing of criminal charges against former PNP chief Gen. Oscar Albayalde and the 13 cops who were involved in an irregular drug operation in Pampanga in 2013.
 October 31 – Cebu City has been selected to be part of the United Nations Educational, Scientific and Cultural Organization (UNESCO) Network of Creative Cities.

November
 November 5 – President Rodrigo Duterte has designated Vice President Leni Robredo as co-chairperson of the Inter-Agency Committee on Anti-Illegal Drugs (ICAD), to handle the government's war on drugs.
 November 6 – The Department of Justice (DOJ) grants refugee status to Iranian beauty queen Bahareh Zare Bahari, who had sought asylum in the Philippines for fear of death or detention in her home country.
 November 8:
 The Supreme Court extends the deadline for the ruling on the cases against Datu Andal "Unsay" Ampatuan Jr. and nearly 200 others tagged in the massacre of 58 people in Maguindanao province on November 23, 2009.
 President Rodrigo Duterte abolishes the Pasig River Rehabilitation Commission (PRRC), after he transferred the river's rehabilitation to the Department of Environment and Natural Resources (DENR).
 November 11 – Six soldiers were killed while 20 others were wounded in a firefight against the New People's Army in Sitio Bangon, Brgy. Pinanag-an, Borongan, Eastern Samar.
 November 15 – The Sandiganbayan finds former Isabela governor Grace Padaca guilty of malversation of public funds and graft in connection with the granting of P25 million to a private entity for Isabela's rice program.
 November 18 – A magnitude 5.9 earthquake struck in Kibawe, Bukidnon, Phivolcs said that the earthquake happened 9:22 pm, with the epicenter Kadingilan, Bukidnon The earthquake, which was tectonic in origin, had a depth of 10 kilometers and was felt in the following areas.

December
December 2 – Typhoon Kammuri (Tisoy) hits the provinces in Southern Luzon, Bicol Region and Visayas, leaving massive damage to agriculture estimated at ₱3.67-billion, and reported death toll of at least 17 people.
December 7 – Majority of residents of the then-named Compostela Valley approve a law (Republic Act No. 11297) changing the name of their province to Davao de Oro in a plebiscite.
 December 8 – Pope Francis names Manila Archbishop Cardinal Luis Antonio Tagle as the new prefect of the Congregation for the Evangelization of Peoples, which is regarded as the second most important position in the Vatican.
 December 15 – A magnitude 6.9 earthquake hits Matanao, Davao del Sur killing 7 people and injuring 100 others. It is the 5th earthquake to hit Mindanao in the span of 3 months.
December 19 – Quezon City Regional Trial Court (RTC) Branch 221 Judge Jocelyn Solis-Reyes serves her judgment on the Maguindanao massacre case at a special court session held at Camp Bagong Diwa in Taguig. In the verdict, the Ampatuan brothers, Datu Andal Ampatuan Jr. and Zaldy Ampatuan, and 28 co-accused are convicted of 57 counts of murder and sentenced to reclusion perpetua (40 years) without parole; 15 are sentenced to 6–10 years for being accessories to the crime; while 55 others are acquitted, including one of the main suspects, incumbent mayor of Shariff Saydona Mustapha, Maguindanao Datu Sajid Islam Ampatuan.
December 24 – Typhoon Phanfone (Ursula) hits the provinces in Southern Luzon and Visayas, especially the areas hit earlier by another typhoon, leaving damages worth at least a billion peso, and reported death toll of 50 people (as of Dec. 31).
December 31 – After 43 years, the Harrison Plaza, a first modern and major shopping mall located in Manila has ceased its operations following the announcement on the memo given by the Martels to the mall's tenants with the family giving them time to clear out the area until January 31, 2020.

Holidays

On August 16, 2018, the government announced at least 18 Philippine holidays for 2019 as declared by virtue of Proclamation No. 555, series of 2018. Note that in the list, holidays in italics are "special non-working holidays," those in bold are "regular holidays," and those in non-italics and non-bold are "special holidays for schools."

In addition, several other places observe local holidays, such as the foundation of their town. These are also "special days."
 January 1 – New Year's Day
 February 5 – Chinese New Year
 February 25 – 1986 EDSA Revolution
 April 9 – Araw ng Kagitingan (Day of Valor)
 April 18 – Maundy Thursday
 April 19 – Good Friday
 April 20 – Black Saturday
 May 1 – Labor Day
 May 13 – Election Day
 June 5 – Eid'l Fitr (Feast of Ramadan)
 June 12 – Independence Day
 August 12 – Eid'l Adha (Feast of Sacrifice)
 August 21 – Ninoy Aquino Day
 August 26 – National Heroes Day
 November 1 – All Saints Day
 November 2 – Special non-working holiday
 November 30 – Bonifacio Day
 December 8 – Feast of the Immaculate Conception
 December 24 – Special non-working holiday
 December 25 – Christmas Day
 December 30 – Rizal Day
 December 31 – Last day of the year (in observance of New Year's celebrations)

Business and economy
 January 19 – Financial services firm Cebuana Lhuillier announces that the personal information of around 900,000 people are affected in a data breach involving their email server which is used for marketing purposes.
December 9 – President Duterte, that the Metropolitan Waterworks and Sewerage System's Subsidiaries Maynilad and Manila Water will expire its agreement on 2022 due to high taxes.

Health

 February 6 – A major measles outbreak, exacerbated by the effects of the Dengvaxia controversy on vaccination, is declared on Metro Manila and Central Luzon.
 February 20 – President Rodrigo Duterte signs the Universal Health Care Act (Republic Act No. 11223), a measure that would provide health care coverage for all Filipinos.
 July 15 – Health Secretary Francisco Duque III declares a "National Dengue Alert" as cases of dengue continue to rise in the country.
 August 6 – Department of Health (DOH) declares a national dengue epidemic following the increasing number of dengue cases in the country.
 September 19 – DOH confirms the re-emergence of polio in the Philippines, 19 years after the World Health Organization declared the country polio-free.
 September 26 – DOH confirms that the death of a 10-year-old student in Pandacan is due to diphtheria, a highly communicable bacterial infection.
 November 15 – DOH confirms the first reported case of an illness related to vaping or the use of e-cigarettes, one involving a teenage girl.
 December 3 – President Rodrigo Duterte signs Republic Act 11463, institutionalizing Malasakit Centers in all Department of Health-run hospitals nationwide.
 December 22–26 – At least 23 people died after drinking methanol-laced lambanog in Laguna and Quezon.

Sports

 January 7–16, Football – The Philippines makes their first-ever appearance in the AFC Asian Cup. The national team fails to advance past beyond the group stage in the edition of the tournament hosted in the United Arab Emirates.
 January 19, Boxing – Manny Pacquiao won via unanimous decision against American boxer Adrien Broner to retain WBA welterweight title at the MGM Grand Garden Arena in Las Vegas, Nevada.
 April 13, Diving – El Nido, Palawan hosts the 11th season of the 2019 Red Bull Cliff Diving World Series, the first time the country as hosts.
 April 27–May 5, Multi-sport events – The Davao City was hosted the 2019 Palarong Pambansa.
 April 27 Boxing – Nonito Donaire was crowned himself as the new WBA "Super" bantamweight champion and after he defeated American boxer Stephon Young for the WBA World Boxing Super Series Semi-finals held in Cajundome, Lafayette, Louisiana.
 May 15:
 Men's Volleyball – The NU Bulldogs are once again the UAAP season 81 Men's Volleyball champions after they defeated the FEU Tamaraws, in four hard-fought sets, on Game 2 of the best of 3 series. Bryan Bagunas was named as the Finals MVP.
 Basketball – The San Miguel Beermen pulled off a rare seven-game sweep after outclassing Magnolia Hotshots, 72–71, in the 2019 PBA Philippine Cup Finals at Smart Araneta Coliseum, Quezon City.
 May 18, Women's Volleyball – The Ateneo Lady Eagles won their third championship after defeating the UST Golden Tigresses of the UAAP Women's Volleyball in the Season 81 Finals at the Mall of Asia Arena in Pasay. Bea de Leon was awarded as finals MVP.
 July 7–12, Floorball – The 2019 Men's Asia-Oceania Floorball Cup was held in Biñan, Laguna. The Philippines, the hosts, finished third.
 July 20, Boxing: – Manny Pacquiao won via split decision against American boxer Keith Thurman to defend WBA Super welterweight championship title at the MGM Grand Garden Arena in Las Vegas, Nevada.
 July 21, Basketball – The Philippines' Mighty Sports defeats the Republic of China White, 81–71, to win the 2019 William Jones Cup.
 August 16, Basketball – The San Miguel Beermen has reclaimed the PBA Commissioner's Cup throne with a convincing 102–90 victory over TNT in Game 6 of the finals at the Araneta Coliseum.
 August 31 – September 15, Basketball – The Gilas Pilipinas grab their fifth losses in the 2019 FIBA Basketball World Cup. The Philippines with a 0–5 record, in four decades the country's worst performance since the 1978 edition.
 September 3, Athletics – Pole vaulter Ernest John "EJ" Obiena became the first Filipino to qualify for the 2020 Tokyo Olympics after surpassing the 5.80-meter qualifying standard in an athletics meet in Chiara, Italy.
 September 20, Wrestling – The World Wrestling Entertainment (WWE) returns to the Philippines for a one-night event, which was held at the Smart Araneta Coliseum.
 October 8, Gymnastics – Filipino gymnast Carlos Edriel Yulo has qualified to compete in the upcoming 2020 Tokyo Olympics after placing 18th in the individual all-around qualification of the 49th FIG Artistic Gymnastics World Championships for the men's division which was held in Stuttgart, Germany.
 October 12, Gymnastics – Filipino gymnast Carlos Edriel Yulo has won the men's floor title at the 2019 World Artistic Gymnastics Championships in Stuttgart, Germany.
 October 13:
 Boxing – Filipina boxer Nesthy Petecio bagged the gold medal in the featherweight division of the 2019 AIBA Women's World Boxing Championships which was held in Ulan-Ude, Russia.
 Karate – Jamie Berberabe Lim, daughter of PBA legend Avelino "Samboy" Lim, wins a gold medal in the 2019 Amatör Spor Haftasi Karate Championship in Sakarya, Turkey.
 October 24:
 Fencing – Filipino teen fencer Samantha Kyle Catantan wins the gold medal in the Asian Under 23 Fencing Championships in Bangkok, Thailand.
 Weightlifting – Vanessa Sarno of the Philippines captured two gold medals and one silver medal, while fellow Filipinos Chariz Macawli and Rosegie Ramos took home a silver and two bronze medals in the 2019 Asian Youth and Junior Weightlifting Championships in Pyongyang, North Korea.
 October 27, Ice Skating – Eleven-year-old skater Katrina Amber Cruz wins 4 gold medals at the Skate Indonesia Leg of the Ice Skating Institute Asia (ISIAsia) Championship Series 2019, which was held in Jakarta.
 November 6, Collegiate sports – University of Santo Tomas Soulemane Chabi Yo and Grace Irebu were named the Most Valuable Player of the Men's and Women's division in UAAP Season 82.
 November 7, Boxing – Nonito Donaire is defeated by Japanese boxer Naoya Inoue via unanimous decision to grab the IBF and WBA bantamweight titles in the World Boxing Super Series bantamweight final, which was held in Saitama Super Arena in Saitama, Japan.
 November 10, Archery – Andrea Robles won a gold medal at the 2019 Indoor Archery World Series, which was held in China.
 November 12, Basketball – Maharlika Pilipinas Basketball League (MPBL) president Manny Pacquiao files a formal complaint with the Department of Justice, against 21 individuals who were accused of game-fixing, betting and point-shaving.
 November 30 – December 11 – Multi-Sport Event – Philippines hosted the 2019 Southeast Asian Games. Despite huge delegation and big expectations of grabbing 149 gold medals, the Philippines as the overall champion also as 1st.

Entertainment and culture

 January 8 – Miss Philippines Francesca Taruc was crowned Miss Tourism World Intercontinental 2019, which was held in Nanjing, China.
 January 22 – Rogel Cabisidan, a Filipino from Paete, Laguna has carved a name for himself in the ice sculpting arena after bagging the jury's prize in the 28th Edition of the International Ice Carving Competition in Valloire in France.
 January 26 – Miss Philippines Karen Gallman wins the Miss Intercontinental title in a pageant night held at the Mall of Asia Arena in Pasay. It was the first time the Philippines won in the pageant.
 February 24 – The coronation event of the Mister International 2019 pageant takes place at the One Esplanade in Pasay. For the second time that the Philippines hosted the event. Trinh Van Bao of Vietnam was crowned as Mister International 2019.
 March 28 – Miss Universe 2015 Pia Wurtzbach's wax figure was unveiled to the public during a press launch at the EDSA Shangri-La Hotel. She is the first Filipino to get a wax figure from Madame Tussauds.
 March 29 – Miss Philippines Maureen Montagne wins the title of 1st runner-up in the Miss Eco International 2019 pageant which was held in Egypt.
 April 5 – The statue of Saint Vincent Ferrer in Bayambang, Pangasinan, with 64 feet and 9.56 inches (50.23 meters) in height, now holds the Guinness World Record as the tallest bamboo sculpture in the world.
 April 7 – Roxanne Baeyens, a 22-year-old Filipino-Belgian beauty representing Baguio City was crowned Face of Tourism Philippines 2019.
 April 17 – Rappler CEO Maria Ressa is named Time magazine's most influential people of 2019, along with some prominent music personalities, government officials and world leaders.
 April 27 – Aly Padillo, an 18-year-old Cebuana was crowned Center Girl for MNL48 2nd Generation at ABS-CBN Vertis Tent.
 May 4 – Janjep Carlos of Philippines was crowned Mr Gay World 2019, which was held in Cape Town, South Africa.
 May 8 – The first coronation event of the Miss Teen Philippines 2019 pageant takes place at the New Frontier Theater in Cubao, Quezon City. Cagayan de Oro student Nikki De Moura won the Miss Teen Philippines pageant.
 June 9 – Gazini Christiana Ganados, from Talisay City, Cebu, was crowned as Miss Universe Philippines 2019, while Bea Patricia Magtanong of Bataan, was also crowned as Binibining Pilipinas-International 2019, during the coronation night of the Binibining Pilipinas 2019, which was held at the Smart Araneta Coliseum in Quezon City.
 July 10 – Janelle Tee, was crowned as Miss Earth Philippines 2019, during the coronation night of the Miss Earth Philippines 2019, which was held at The Cove, Okada Manila, Parañaque.
 July 16 – 5 MOR Pinoy Music Awards, was held at the Smart Araneta Coliseum, Quezon City, which was coincide with the sixth anniversary of MOR 101.9 For Life!.
 July 17 – 20-year-old Jane De Leon has been chosen to portray the iconic role of Filipino heroine "Darna".
 July 28:
 Aicelle Santos has finished the 2nd Placer at the ASEAN+3 Song Contest which was held in Vietnam. Timmy Pavino also represented the Philippines in the singing competition.
 Zephanie Dimaranan of Laguna won as the first Idol Philippines grand champion.
 August 4 – Yamyam Gucong of Bohol was hailed as the Big Winner of Pinoy Big Brother: Otso.
 August 5 – Jin Macapagal of Cebu City won as the first BidaMan of It's Showtime.
 August 13 – President Rodrigo Duterte signs Republic Act No. 11370, declaring September 8 a special working holiday to commemorate the birth of the Blessed Virgin Mary.
 August 18 – Klyza Castro of Davao City was crowned as Mutya ng Pilipinas-Asia Pacific International 2019, during the coronation night of the Mutya Pilipinas 2019, which was held at the Mall of Asia Arena in Pasay.
 August 23 – The coronation event of the Mister World 2019 pageant was held at the Smart Araneta Coliseum in Quezon City, the first time that the Philippines hosted the event. Jack Heslewood of England won the Mr World pageant.
 September 9 – Filipino music icon Ryan Cayabyab and four other Asians officially receive the Ramon Magsaysay Award at the Cultural Center of the Philippines.
 September 15:
 Kim de Leon and Shayne Sava were hailed as the Ultimate Male and Female Survivors for the 7th season of StarStruck.
 Michelle Dee of Makati City was crowned as Miss World Philippines 2019, during the coronation night of the Miss World Philippines 2019, which was held at the Smart Araneta Coliseum in Quezon City.
 September 28 – Elaine Duran of Butuan was hailed as the winner of the 3rd season of Tawag ng Tanghalan.
 October 4 – The Miss World Philippines Organization has announced, that Vanessa Mae Walters had been stripped of the Miss Eco Teen Philippines 2019 title for violating the organization's rules. She was replaced by Mary Daena Zaide Resurrecion.
 October 13 – "Mabagal", a song entry composed by Dan Martel Simon Tañedo and interpreted by Daniel Padilla and Moira Dela Torre was named as Himig Handog 2019 grand winner.
 October 22 – Miss Philippines Leren Mae Bautista wins 2nd runner-up title at the Miss Globe 2019, which was held in Montenegro.
 October 26:
 Nicole Borromeo (from Cebu) was crowned as Miss Millennial Philippines 2019 of the noontime show, Eat Bulaga! held at the Meralco Theater.
 J-Crisis (from Sampaloc, Manila) was hailed as the Classic Showtime 10th Anniversary Grand Champion of the noontime show, It's Showtime held at the Newport Performing Arts Theater, Resorts World Manila.
 Team Vice with Miss Q and A Queens was hailed as Magpasikat 2019 Grand Champion of the noontime show, It's Showtime held at Newport Performing Arts Theater, Resorts World Manila.
 Nellys Pimentel of Puerto Rico was crowned as Miss Earth 2019, during the coronation night of the Miss Earth 2019 Pageant, which was held at the Cove Manila at Okada Manila in Parañaque.
 October 30 – Jose Saguban wins the main award for Top 20 best cacao beans in the world, finishing second in the Asia Pacific region in the prestigious Salon du Chocolat or the International Cocoa Awards.
 October 31 – The province of Sorsogon bagged the Guinness World Record for the largest Filipino folk dance with its Pantomina sa Tinampo performance as they celebrated the province's 125th year founding year.
 November 3:
 Vanjoss Bayaban, coached by Sarah Geronimo, won the fourth season of The Voice Kids, the grand finals of which were held at the Newport Performing Arts Theater, Resorts World Manila.
 Miss Philippines Kayesha Clauden Chua was crowned Miss Asia Awards 2019, during the coronation night which was held at Holiday Inn and Suites Saigon Airport in Ho Chi Minh City, Vietnam.
 November 6 – Two documentaries programs of GMA Network: "Reporter's Notebook: Batas ng Karagatan" and "The Atom Araullo Specials: Babies4sale.Ph", were gave honors to the Philippines at the prestigious 2019 Association for International Broadcasting Awards (AIBs), which was held in London.
 November 8 – Miss Philippines Cyrille Payumo was crowned as the new Miss Tourism International 2019, during the coronation night which was held at the Sunway Resort Hotel & Spa in Petaling Jaya, Malaysia.
 November 9 – Ethel Booba of General Santos emerged as the first-ever Tawag ng Tanghalan Celebrity Grand Champion.
 December 1 – Patricia Javier was crowned as the first ever Noble Queen of the Universe, during the coronation night which was held at the Manila Hotel.
 December 8 – Miss Philippines Gazini Ganados placed in the Top 20 of the Miss Universe 2019 at Tyler Perry Studios in Atlanta, Georgia, United States.

Deaths

January
 January 4 – Homobono T. Cezar, (b. 1949), former representative of Misamis Oriental
 January 6 – George Hofer, (b. 1939), former Governor of Zamboanga Sibugay
 January 7 – Carmencita Reyes, (b. 1931), Governor of Marinduque
 January 11 – Angelo Constantino, (b. 1970), bowler
 January 12 – Nes Pamilar, (b. 1966), volleyball head coach
 January 16 – Brian Velasco, (b. 1977), drummer (Razorback).
 January 19 – Henry Sy, (b. 1924), business magnate (SM Prime)
 January 21 – Leonardo Quisumbing, (b. 1939), Associate Justice of the Supreme Court of the Philippines (1998–2009)
 January 28 – Pepe Smith, (b. 1947), drummer and guitarist (Juan de la Cruz Band)

February
 February 9 – Bentong (comedian) (b. 1964), actor and comedian
 February 11 – Armida Siguion-Reyna (b. 1930), actress
 February 20 – Francisco Mañosa (b. 1931), architect and National Artist of the Philippines
 February 23:
 Nestor Espenilla Jr., (b. 1958), banker and Governor of the Bangko Sentral (2017–2019).
 Kristoffer King, (b. 1983), indie film actor

March
 March 5 – Annie Brazil, (b. 1933), jazz singer
 March 8 – Boyong Baytion, (b. 1953), comedian and assistant director (Palibhasa Lalake, Abangan Ang Susunod Na Kabanata, Ang TV and Home Along Da Riles)
 March 9 – Chokoleit, (b. 1972), TV host, actor, and comedian
 March 13:
 Ghazali Jaafar, (b. 1943), Vice chairman of Moro Islamic Liberation Front
 Maria "Bulaklak" Ausente, (b. 1989), Former TV Patrol Panay and GMA News correspondent
 March 18 – Augusto Victa, (b. 1931), former TV and radio drama actor
 March 31 – Ferdie Marquez, founding member of True Faith

April
 April 4 – Mark Joseph Ubalde, (b. 1986), former GMA News and News5 reporter, contributor and researcher of VERA Files
 April 16 – Jose Mari Gonzales, (b. 1938), actor and politician.
 April 19 – Rodolfo Severino Jr., (b. 1936), former Secretary-General of the ASEAN (1998–2002), and ambassador to Malaysia (1989–1992)
 April 25 – Levy P. Laus, (b. 1951), CEO of Laus Group Company
 April 28:
 Fred Espinoza, (b. 1928), reporter and columnist
 Teresita Ojeda, (b. 1930), board member of Cultural Center of the Philippines (CPP) (1999–2007)
 April 30 – Vic Vic Villavicencio, (b. 1952), founder of Triple V Group of Companies

May
 May 4 – Prospero Nograles, (b. 1947), former member of the Philippine House of Representatives from Davao City's 1st District (2001–2010) and 22nd Speaker of the House of Representatives of the Philippines (2008–2010)
 May 7:
 Karina Constantino David, (b. 1946) political activist and public servant
 Vicente Emano, (b. 1943) former Governor of Misamis Oriental (1988–1998) and Mayor of Cagayan de Oro (1998–2007, 2010–2013)
 Joel Virador, (b. 1967) former member of the House of Representatives (2003–2007)
 May 8 – Rudy Francisco, (b. 1923), actor and lawyer
 May 9 – Abul Khayr Alonto, (b. 1945) former chairman of the Mindanao Development Authority (since 2016)
 May 11 – Rosa Olondriz Caram, (b. 1925), former officer-in-charge (OIC) mayor of Iloilo City (1986–87)
 May 15:
 Bienvenido Alejandro, (b. 1926), co-founder of Papemelroti
 Crescencia Lucero, (b. 1942), member of Franciscan Sisters of the Immaculate Conception (SFIC) and chairperson of Task Force Detainees of the Philippines (TFDP)
 May 19 – Susan Papa, (b. 1955), president of Philippine Swimming League (PSL)
 May 23 – Jojo A. Robles, (b. 1962), journalist and former editor-in-chief of Manila Standard and The Manila Times
 May 30 – Clinton Palanca, (b. 1974), award-winning author and one of the Philippine's premier food writers
 May 31 – Gary Lising, (b. 1942), comedian and author

June
 June 18 – Ricardo "Ricky" Ramirez, former mayor of Medellin, Cebu
 June 20 – Eddie Garcia, (b. 1929) veteran actor, director and television personality
 June 21:
 Jacqui Magno, (b. 1954) jazz singer
 Andres Ma. Brillantes Bernos, former governor of Abra
 April Love Jordan, (b. 1988) beauty pageant titlist; Miss World Philippines 2012 (3rd Princess)
 June 30 – Miguel Bonalos, (b. 1999) former basketball player

July
 July 1 – Renato Lumawag, (b. 1944) veteran photojournalist
 July 7 – Jose Balajadia Jr., (b. 1944) former Sergeant-at-Arms (Senate of the Philippines)
 July 8 – Chito Arceo, (b. 1949) former actor and television sales executive
 July 9 – Martin I. Tinio, Jr., (b. 1943) antiquarian, art historian, curator, interior designer
 July 21 – Claro Pellosis, (b. 1960) Olympic sprinter
 July 29 – Jasmin Basar (DJ Jasmin), (b. 1984) Radio DJ (MOR 101.9)

August
 August 8 – Pastor "Boy" Saycon, (b. 1951) political strategist and member of the EDSA People Power Commission
 August 16 – Eddie Baddeo, (b. 1961) fashion designer
 August 18 – Sophia Corullo, (b. 2013) child actress
 August 19 – Gina Lopez, (b. 1953) environmentalist, former DENR secretary (2016–2017), former chairperson of ABS-CBN Foundation
 August 20 – Ernesto Lariosa, (b. 1944) Cebuano writer, poet, and columnist
 August 21 – Julian Daan a.k.a. Esteban "Teban" Escudero, (b. 1945) radio personality (DYHP), actor, comedian, incumbent Talisay City councillor, former Cebu Provincial board member and Vice-Governor
 August 25 – Gloria Lerma Yatco a.k.a. Mona Lisa, (b. 1922) actress

September
 September 8 – Lito Legaspi, (b. 1942) actor
 September 9 – Sari Yap, (b. 1962) founder of Mega Magazine
 September 13 – Rene Espina, (b. 1929) former senator and governor of Cebu
 September 21:
 Isah Red, (b. 1952) showbiz columnist (The Daily Tribune)
 Lyndon Lee Suy, (b. 1964) former DOH Spokesperson
 Mel Chionglo, (b. 1946) film director and production designer
 September 22 – Nelson Navarro, (b. 1948) veteran journalist and author
 September 24:
 Jojit Paredes, (b. 1951) former actor and singer
Luisito Reyes, (b. 1930) former governor of Marinduque

October
 October 4 – Tony Mabesa, (b. 1935) film and theater actor and director
 October 5:
 Amalia Fuentes, (b. 1940) actress
 Bobby Baruelo, (b. 1961) former BFP director (2016–2017)
 October 8 – Carlos Celdran, (b. 1972) cultural activist and performance artist
 October 9 – Charlie Yuson III, vice mayor of Batuan, Masbate
 October 20:
 Aquilino Pimentel Jr., (b. 1933) former Senator of the Philippines (1987–1992, 1998–2010) and 23rd President of the Senate of the Philippines (2000–2001)
 Jon Ross Delos Santos a.k.a. Lil John, fliptop rapper
 October 25 – David Navarro, mayor of Clarin, Misamis Occidental

November
 November 1 – Datu Ombra Sinsuat, mayor of Datu Odin Sinsuat, Maguindanao
 November 5 – Rodolfo Albano Jr., (b. 1934) LPGMA party-list representative and former Isabela representative
 November 9 – John Gokongwei Jr., (b. 1926) business magnate (JG Summit Holdings)
 November 11 – Lucio "Bong" Tan Jr.., (b. 1966) president of Philippine Airlines Holdings Inc. (PHI)
 November 14 – Jose "Pepe" Ong, (b. 1941) chairman and co-founder of CDO Foodsphere Inc.
 November 16 – Elizabeth Yu Gokongwei (b. 1934) wife of the late business magnate, John Gokongwei.
 November 30 – Milagrosa Tan, (b. 1958) incumbent governor of Samar

December
 December 1:
 Edgardo Gomez, (b. 1938) biologist.
 Licerna Abunda, (b. 1929) politician and mother of Boy Abunda.
 December 5 – Amber Torres, (b. 2003) motor car rider
 December 9 – Miko Palanca, (b. 1978), actor
 December 13 – Cesar Apolinario, (b. 1973) GMA News reporter and host of iJuander
December 18 – Nestor Fongwan, (b. 1951) representative of Lone District of Benguet and former governor of the province.
 December 21 – Gerry Alanguilan, (b. 1968) comic book author
December 24 – Constancio Torralba, (b.1928) former governor of Bohol (1988–1992).

See also

 Years in the Philippines
 Timeline of Philippine history

References

×

 
2019 in Southeast Asia
Philippines
2010s in the Philippines
Years of the 21st century in the Philippines